Kai Luibrand (born 24 April 1994) is a German footballer who plays as a forward for FV Illertissen.

References

Living people
1994 births
German footballers
Association football forwards
Karlsruher SC II players
Karlsruher SC players
SSV Ulm 1846 players
FV Illertissen players
2. Bundesliga players
3. Liga players
Regionalliga players
People from Biberach an der Riss
Sportspeople from Tübingen (region)
Footballers from Baden-Württemberg